Marissa Aroy is a Filipino-American director and producer. She directed the documentaries Sikhs in America, which received an Emmy award for "best historical program", and The Delano Manongs. Aroy is also co-founder of the production company, Media Factory. A Fulbright Scholar, Aroy was recently listed as one of the "Notable Asian Americans in Entertainment" by the Center for Asian American Media and cited by BuzzFeed as one of the "Legendary Filipino Americans in the US".

Education 
Aroy got her undergraduate degree in Psychology at Boston College and went on to complete a Master's in Journalism at UC Berkeley.  She spent two years as a Peace Corps volunteer in the Dominican Republic working in the public health sector and creating a film about HIV/AIDS in the Dominican Republic. As a Fulbright Scholar, Aroy filmed a narrative about the effects of emigration on one family called Recipe.

Filmmaking 
Aroy produced and directed the documentary Sikhs in America for which she received an Emmy. She also received an Emmy nomination for her PBS documentary The Delano Manongs: Forgotten Heroes of the United Farm Workers. This documentary highlights the role of Filipinos in the Delano Grape Strike of 1965 in California and the formation the United Farm Workers. "My goal," said Aroy in an interview for caamedia.org, "is to get Filipinos to learn about this history and be proud of it and have a better understanding of our contributions to the American fabric."

Through Aroy's company Media Factory, she created interactive video elements about climate change with Bill Nye the Science Guy for the Chabot Space & Science Center, and has worked with various companies and non-profit organization to create videos and serialized content. Aroy worked with UNICEF as a video producer/communications specialist in the UNICEF New York headquarters before spending four months writing and filming stories in the Typhoon Haiyan-affected areas of the Philippines soon after the disaster.

In 2016, Aroy debuted her short film TGIF- Thank God I'm Filipino! - a response to the lack of Filipino American representation in pan Asian American media at the time.

See also
 Filipinos in the New York metropolitan area

References

External links 
 Media Factory website
 Delano Manongs website
 Sikhs in America documentary

Year of birth missing (living people)
Living people
American documentary filmmakers
Morrissey College of Arts & Sciences alumni
UC Berkeley Graduate School of Journalism alumni
Place of birth missing (living people)
Peace Corps volunteers